WLPR-FM is an FM noncommercial, public radio station broadcasting on 89.1 MHz in Lowell, Indiana and serving Northwest Indiana. The station is owned and operated by Northwest Indiana Public Broadcasting, Inc., which also owns PBS member station WYIN (channel 56), serving as an alternative to Chicago's WBEZ in the Chicago market's eastern reaches. WLPR broadcasts from the WZVN tower on SR-55, just north of SR-2.

History
The station began broadcasting in 2006, and held the call sign WWLO. It was owned by American Family Association and was an affiliate of American Family Radio. In January 2009, the station was sold to Northwest Indiana Public Broadcasting, Inc. for $1,050,000. On January 16, 2009, its call sign was changed to WLPR-FM and it adopted a public radio format, with programming from NPR.

References

External links
Official Website

LPR-FM
NPR member stations
Mass media in Lake County, Indiana
Radio stations established in 2006
2006 establishments in Indiana